Queen Munmyeong (Hangul: 문명왕후, Hanja: 文明王后) (d. 681) was a Korean queen consort. She was the spouse of King Muyeol of Silla.

Issue
King Munmu of Silla (626 – 681)
Kim Inmun (Hangul: 김인문, Hanja: 金仁問) (629 – 694)
Lady Jiso (Hangul: 지소부인, Hanja: 智炤夫人)

References

  Lee, Soyoung; Leidy, Denise Patry (2013). Silla: Korea's Golden Kingdom. [S.l.]: Metropolitan Museum of Art, p. 21. 

7th-century births
681 deaths
Royal consorts of Silla
7th-century Korean women